Steve Rapira (born 17 December 1988) is a New Zealand former professional rugby league footballer. A second-row forward, he previously played in the National Rugby League for the North Queensland Cowboys and New Zealand Warriors, and English club Salford Red Devils of Super League, and is the younger brother of New Zealand international, Sam Rapira.

Background
Rapira played for Hukanui in the Waikato Rugby League competition and the Waicoa Bay Stallions in the Bartercard Cup. Rapira played for the New Zealand Under-16's in 2004 and made the Junior Kiwis in 2005. He became a New Zealand Warriors junior and playing in their inaugural Toyota Cup team. He played for the Junior Warriors 10 times in 2008 and scored two tries.

Professional playing career

National Rugby League
In 2009 Rapira joined North Queensland Cowboys, playing for the Mackay Cutters in the Queensland Cup. He made his first grade début on 11 April 2010 against the Gold Coast Titans. He was named the club's rookie of the year in 2009.

In 2010 Rapira signed a two-year contract to re-join the New Zealand Warriors for the 2011 and 2012 seasons, with an option on a third year.

He made his Warriors début in Round 13 on 4 June 2011. For the 2012 season Rapira has been "re-modelled" as a prop.

Super League
Rapira signed to play in the Super League for English club the Salford Red Devils in 2014.

Queensland Cup
In 2015, Rapira returned to the Mackay Cutters in the Queensland Cup.

References

External links
Steve Rapira North Queensland Cowboys

1988 births
Living people
Auckland rugby league team players
Junior Kiwis players
Mackay Cutters players
New Zealand Māori rugby league players
New Zealand rugby league players
New Zealand Warriors players
North Queensland Cowboys players
Rugby league players from Hamilton, New Zealand
Rugby league props
Rugby league second-rows
Salford Red Devils players
Waicoa Bay Stallions players
Waikato rugby league team players